Richard Thomas Timms (born 23 August 1986 in Bristol) is an English geneticist and molecular biologist and former cricketer.

Personal life
Richard Timms is married and lives with his wife in Cambridge, UK.

Cricketing
Richard is a right-handed batsman and fast-medium bowler.  He attended Millfield School, and was captain of the first XI while there.  He made his List A debut in 2002 for Somerset Cricket Board, playing in the first round of the Cheltenham and Gloucester Trophy.  He scored 38 not out, batting at number eight.  He played Second XI cricket for Somerset from 2004 until 2006, but failed to break into the first-team.  While at Cambridge University, he played seven first-class matches for the university, including two Varsity matches.  He scored two half-centuries in first-class cricket, against Warwickshire, and Oxford University.

Scientific Career
Richard Timms completed his PhD in at the Cambridge Institute for Medical Research in Cambridge, England where he performed genetic screens to identify functions of genes. In particular, he identified the HUSH complex as a regulator of  epigenetic repression. After graduating, he continued in the laboratory of Stephen Elledge at Harvard Medical School, where he characterized N-end and C-end protein degradation pathways. He started his own laboratory at the University of Cambridge in 2020.

References

External links
 
 Timms Laboratory Website

Somerset cricketers
English cricketers
1984 births
Living people
Somerset Cricket Board cricketers
Cambridge University cricketers
Cambridge MCCU cricketers
Cricketers from Bristol
English cricketers of the 21st century
People educated at Millfield